Fane may refer to:

People
 Fane (surname)
 Fane family, an English family
 Viscount Fane, an extinct title in the Peerage of Ireland
 Fane Flaws (1951–2021), New Zealand musician, songwriter and artist
 Fane Lozman, American inventor and trader

Places
 River Fane in Ireland
 Fane, Papua New Guinea, a village associated with Simona Noorenbergh
 Fane Airport, an airfield serving Fane

Organizations
 Fédération d'action nationale et européenne, a French former neo-Nazi organization
 Fane Aircraft Company, a defunct British aircraft manufacturer

See also
 Fain (disambiguation)
 Fana (disambiguation)
 Fané
 Phanes (disambiguation)
 Vane (disambiguation)